Youssouf Hersi (born 20 August 1982) is a retired professional footballer who played as an attacking midfielder.

Born in Ethiopia, Hersi represented the Netherlands at youth international level.

Club career

Hersi has played in the Netherlands for Ajax, NAC Breda, NEC, Heerenveen, Vitesse, Twente and De Graafschap. He has also played for the Greek side AEK Athens.

On 11 September 2012, Hersi signed with A-League club Western Sydney Wanderers. He scored his first goal for the club in the Sydney Derby on 15 December 2012. In February 2013, Hersi re-signed with the Wanderers for another season. On 10 March 2013, against Wellington Phoenix Hersi broke the Australian football record for most consecutive wins for a player (14) beating Matt Horsley's 13 wins for the Wollongong Wolves from April to December 2001. Hersi was sent off with a second yellow card in the Wanderers' Grand Final qualifier against Brisbane Roar FC and subsequently missed the 2013 A-League Grand Final in which the Wanderers lost 2–0 to Central Coast Mariners FC.

In May 2014 Hersi signed with Perth Glory. He requested a release from the club in May 2015, which was granted despite having another year to run on his contract.

Hersi was set to sign for the Central Coast Mariners in February 2016 but the deal was scuppered at the last minute after he travelled to Australia on the wrong type of visa.

International career
Hersi played with the Dutch under-21 team at the 2001 FIFA World Youth Championship.

He was never capped for the Dutch full national side, although he had expressed an interest in representing the nation of his birth Ethiopia at the international level,

References

External links

Living people
1982 births
Sportspeople from Dire Dawa
Association football midfielders
Association football forwards
Dutch footballers
Netherlands youth international footballers
Ethiopian footballers
Ethiopian emigrants to the Netherlands
AFC Ajax players
SC Heerenveen players
NAC Breda players
NEC Nijmegen players
SBV Vitesse players
FC Twente players
De Graafschap players
Eredivisie players
AEK Athens F.C. players
Super League Greece players
Footballers from Amsterdam
Western Sydney Wanderers FC players
Perth Glory FC players
A-League Men players
Dutch expatriate footballers
Dutch expatriate sportspeople in Greece
Expatriate footballers in Greece
Dutch expatriate sportspeople in Australia
Expatriate soccer players in Australia
Dutch people of Ethiopian descent